Farzin Khanjani (born 4 October 1994) is an Iranian male badminton player. At the age of 19, Khanjani won the men's singles title at the Kenya International tournament, and became the runner-up in the men's doubles event partnered with Mehran Shahbazi. He also won the South Africa International tournament in the men's doubles event in 2014 and 2015.

Achievements

BWF International Challenge/Series
Men's Singles

Men's Doubles

 BWF International Challenge tournament
 BWF International Series tournament
 BWF Future Series tournament

References

External links
 

1994 births
Living people
Iranian male badminton players